.sol can refer to:

 sol (format), a file format for presenting solutions of mathematical programming problems
 Local shared object
 Solidity .sol source file for smart contracts that run on the Ethereum Virtual Machine